Belarus competed at the 2008 Summer Paralympics in Beijing, People's Republic of China.

Medallists

Sports

Athletics

Men's track

Men's field

Women's track

Women's field

Cycling

Men's track

Women's road

Women's track

Rowing

Swimming

Men

Women

Wheelchair fencing

Men

Women

See also
Belarus at the Paralympics
Belarus at the 2008 Summer Olympics

External links
International Paralympic Committee

Nations at the 2008 Summer Paralympics
2008
Summer Paralympics